The Royal Regiment of New Zealand Artillery is the artillery regiment of the New Zealand Army. It is effectively a military administrative corps, and can comprise multiple component regiments. This nomenclature stems from its heritage as an offshoot of the British Army's Royal Artillery. In its current form it was founded in 1947 with the amalgamation of the regular and volunteer corps of artillery in New Zealand. In 1958 in recognition of services rendered it was given the title the Royal Regiment of New Zealand Artillery.

History

Predecessors and formation
The Royal Regiment of New Zealand Artillery's predecessor units in the Volunteer Force date from February 1866, when the first field artillery battery and naval artillery corps were formed. From 1878 the various field batteries were administratively grouped together as the New Zealand Regiment of Artillery Volunteers, and were designated alphabetically. The naval artillery batteries were grouped as the New Zealand Garrison Artillery Volunteers in 1902. Meanwhile, the establishment of coast defences from the mid-1880s had necessitated the creation of a small permanent artillery force within the Permanent Military, which was designated the Royal New Zealand Artillery (RNZA) on 15 October 1902. Following the formation of the Territorial Force in 1911 the Regiment of New Zealand Field Artillery and the New Zealand Garrison Artillery Volunteers became part of the New Zealand Artillery. During this time the permanent RNZA maintained an instructional and cadre role.

Between 2–5 August 1914 pre-war plans to establish harbour examination batteries and mobilise the then Royal New Zealand Artillery (active force) and New Zealand Garrison Artillery (territorials) were carried out. The examination batteries' task was to interrogate unidentified vessels entering port. The examination batteries at Fort Takapuna, Point Gordon in Wellington, Fort Jervois and Howlett Point at the entrance to Port Chalmers were manned around the clock until 15 March 1915. After that date guns and equipment were maintained at a high state of readiness, with battery personnel available at a few hours' notice.' During initial mobilisation for the First World War, it was intended that one six-gun 18-pounder battery would form part of the initial contingent of the New Zealand Expeditionary Force. Following large numbers volunteering for artillery, it was decided to raise the a brigade of three batteries, totalling twelve 18-pounders. The initial brigade departed with the rest of the Main Body on 16 October 1914. Eventually two New Zealand field artillery brigades (regiment-sized units) served with the New Zealand and Australian Division. Following the end of the war the New Zealand Artillery was renamed the Regiment of New Zealand Artillery.

During the Second World War, 4, 5 and 6 Field Regiments sailed with the 2nd New Zealand Expeditionary Force; initially also despatched was 7 Anti-Tank Regiment and 14 Light Anti-Aircraft Regiment. A number of artillery regiments and batteries served with the 2nd New Zealand Expeditionary Force in the Pacific (2 NZEF IP), and 3rd Division. After the war ended, the Territorial Force was reconstituted in the late 1940s, and a number of field, mortar (5th Light Regiment RNZA), and coastal units were created. In January 1947 the Regiment of New Zealand Artillery was amalgamated with the RNZA.

Korean War
When the Korean War broke out in June 1950, a Regular Force regiment, 16th Field Regiment RNZA, was established as the core of New Zealand's deployed contingent, known as Kayforce, in January 1951. The battery was attached to the 27th British Brigade of the 1st Commonwealth Division. The 16th Field Regiment first saw action a month later and remained on active service for the next two and a half years. The 16th Field Regiment subsequently provided close support to the British Commonwealth infantry and was later awarded the South Korean Presidential Unit Citation for its actions during the Battle of Kapyong in April 1951. Between 1951 and 1953 the regiment fire more than 750,000 shells, operating 25-pounders. After the Armistice was signed in 1954, Kayforce’s numbers were gradually reduced. The 16th Field Regiment and other Corps elements were withdrawn in 1955. The last elements of Kayforce returned to New Zealand in 1957.

1950s
In 1955, the regiment consisted of the following units:
District Troops
Northern Military District
9th Coast Regiment (Auckland)
13th Composite Anti-aircraft Regiment
Central Military District
10th Coast Regiment (Wellington)
14th Composite Anti-aircraft Regiment
Southern Military District
11th Coast Regiment (Lyttleton Respectively)
151st Composite Anti-aircraft Battery RNZA (15th Composite AA Regiment disbanded Sept 1954)
Divisional Troops
Headquarters Royal Artillery
Command
Royal Artillery Staff Troop
Divisional Counter Bombardment Staff Troop
1st Field Regiment (Auckland)
2nd Field Regiment (Palmerston North)
3rd Field Regiment (Dunedin)
4th Medium Regiment (Hamilton)
5th Light Regiment (Wellington)
6th Light Anti-aircraft Regiment (Auckland)
12th Heavy Anti-aircraft Regiment (HQ Auckland)
1st Locating Battery

The 1957 National Government defence review directed the discontinuation of coastal defence training, and the approximately 1000 personnel of the 9th, 10th, and 11th Coastal Regiments had their Compulsory Military Training obligation removed. A small cadre of regulars remained, but as Henderson, Green, and Cook say, 'the coastal artillery had quietly died.' All the fixed guns were dismantled and sold for scrap by the early 1960s. The three regiments survived on paper until 1967, 'each in its final years at an actual strength of a single warrant officer, the District Gunner, whose duties mainly involved taking care of the mobile 3.7-inch guns allocated for emergency harbour defences.'

In 1958 the regiment was redesignated the Royal Regiment of New Zealand Artillery. The 16th Field Regiment RNZA was reformed at this time as part of the Regular Force Brigade Group. In 1961 the last two anti-aircraft regiments were disbanded. Meanwhile, from 1963 Italian designed 105-mm L5 Pack Howitzers began replacing the 25-pounders. 5th Light Regiment RNZA was disbanded in 1964.

Vietnam War

A rotational RNZA battery was deployed to South Vietnam during the Vietnam War.

In 1965 the United States government committed its 173rd Airborne Brigade to South Vietnam in a combat role. Being part of the ANZUS pact Australia and New Zealand were asked to contribute military forces too. Up until this time the Australians had committed an Army training team and New Zealand had committed some non-combatant engineers. In response to the United States' request, the Australian government committed an infantry battalion and New Zealand committed an artillery battery. 161 Field Battery, RNZA arrived in South Vietnam on 16 July 1965. The Australian infantry regiment and the New Zealand artillery battery served under operational control of the 173rd Airborne in Biên Hòa Province. 161 Bty was attached as the third battery of the US 3rd Battalion, 319th Field Artillery Regiment. The battery began its first major operation on 14 September 1965. Sergeant Alastair John Sherwood Don and Bombardier Robert White of 161 Bty were the first New Zealand casualties of the Vietnam War when the front of their vehicle was blown up by a Vietcong command detonated mine during the initial road convoy on Operation Ben Cat.

In their first year, under U.S command the battery took part in: 
 Battle of Gang Toi during Operation Hump,
 Operation New Life (15 November – 16 December 1965) 
 Operation Marauder (1–8 January 1966)
 Operation Crimp (8–16 January 1966) 
 Operation Entrée in general support of 1/503 US Infantry's operations, 
 Battle of Suoi Bong Trang during Operation Rolling Stone in support of 1RAR, 
 Operation Abilene in support of 1st US Infantry Division,
 Operation Denver as part of "Force Essex", and 
 Operation Enoggera in support of newly arrived 6RAR.

In May 1966 it was decided to create an Australian task force with its own tactical area of responsibility (TAOR.) Phước Tuy Province was to be designated the TAOR for the new task force.

The 1st Australian Task Force (1ATF) was formed in June 1966, with a base built at Nui Dat. The New Zealand government was given the choice of allowing the artillery battery to remain at Bien Hoa under U.S command with the 173rd Airborne or integrate the battery with the new task force. The decision was made to integrate the battery into 1ATF under 105 Battery, Royal Australian Artillery which had arrived at the end of September 1965.

In the 1991 movie documentary The Cu Chi Tunnels Vietcong survivors who hid in the Cu Chi tunnels during Operation Crimp said they called the artillery bombardments above them "The New Zealand Dong Dun Orchestra."

As part of 1ATF, the New Zealand battery is remembered well for its role in the Battle of Long Tan on 18 August 1966, during which it played a key role in supporting the outnumbered Australian infantry from D Company, 6th Battalion, Royal Australian Regiment hold off a regimental-sized Viet Cong force. Three New Zealand artillery Forward Observers attached to D Company controlled the guns of their own battery, the two Australian batteries, and two American batteries – a total of 24 guns, in support of themselves and the rest of D Company for more than 3.5 hours firing 6-8 rounds per minute almost non-stop.

In 1967 the battery's L5 howitzers were replaced by heavier and more robust American M2A2 Howitzers.

Also in 1967, the first company of New Zealand infantry arrived, followed by a second company in December 1967. The two infantry companies eventually amalgamated with one of the three 1ATF battalions in March 1968 to form the "ANZAC Battalion." This practice continued with each New Zealand infantry company rotating with or within 6 months of a new rotation of Australian infantry, designated "ANZAC Battalion" each time. When the New Zealand battery was called upon to support 1ATF infantry operations, Forward Observers from the battery would accompany the Australian, New Zealand, or U.S infantry units on operations to direct fire when needed.

The battery would continue to support allied forces throughout its entire time in Vietnam including participation in Operation Bribie in 1967, and Operation Coburg, the Tet Offensive and the Battle of Coral–Balmoral in 1968.

As Australian and New Zealand combat units began to be withdrawn in keeping with US troop reductions, the battery was withdrawn in May 1971. The battery was involved in 17 major operations during their time in Vietnam. It was the longest serving Allied unit in South Vietnam after the 173rd Airborne Brigade, having been continuously deployed for six years, ten months and 21 days. 

Approximately 750 members of the 161st Battery served in Vietnam with a loss of 5 killed and 22 wounded.

1980s–1990s
A range of new capabilities were introduced during this period. In 1986 the British designed, Australian produced 105-mm L119 Hamel Light Gun was introduced, while computerized artillery systems were introduced in 1989, and global positioning systems in 1997, which resulted in a significant increase in capability. In 1997 the French Mistral short range air defence missile was acquired, providing an anti-aircraft capability for the first time since 1961. The headquarters of 3rd Field Regiment RNZA was disbanded in 1990, with its two subordinate TF batteries remaining.

Twenty-first century

Today, the RNZA consists of a single regiment:

16 Field Regiment, Royal New Zealand Artillery
Regimental Headquarters
HQ Battery
JOST Troop
161 Battery (Close Support) – L119 Light Gun, L16A2 81mm mortar
Headquarters Troop
Able Troop
Baker Troop
Command Post Troop
163 Battery (Close Support) – L119 Light Gun, L16A2 81mm mortar
Headquarters Troop
Easy Troop
Fox Troop
Command Post Troop

Members of the 16th Field Regiment formed part of the New Zealand Battalion deployed on peacekeeping operations in East Timor.

The School of Artillery is active.

Territorial units
In addition, there are a number of Territorial Force artillery units; these were formerly units of the RNZA, but were moved into the structure of the TF battalion groups on the restructuring of the army in the late 1990s:
11(A) Battery (Auckland) (Close Support), 3rd Auckland (Countess of Ranfurly's Own) and Northland Battalion Group (Amalgamated 1990s)
22(D) Battery (Wellington) (Air Defence), 7th Wellington (City of Wellington's Own) and Hawke's Bay Battalion Group (Disbanded 1990's)
31(B) Battery (Dunedin) 4th Otago and Southland Battalion Group  (Disbanded 1990s)
32(E) Battery (Christchurch) (Observation Post), 2nd Canterbury, and Nelson-Marlborough and West Coast Battalion Group (Disbanded 1990s
4 (G) Medium Battery (Hamilton) (Amalgamated 1990s)

RNZA Territorial-Reserve Battery's/Troops as of 2020:

11/4 Battery RNZA (Comes under 16 Field Regiment RNZA)
22 Troop RNZA (Linton) (Comes under 16 Field Regiment RNZA)

The Battle Honours of the above three Territorial Force artillery units are for South Africa, World War I and World War II.

Distinctions
A composite unit of the RNZA became the first specific New Zealand unit to mount the Queen's Guard at Buckingham Palace in 1964 (previously, the contingents sent to the Coronation had mounted the guard).

The South Vietnam Presidential Unit Citation 1st Class was presented to 161 Bty in 1977 for its service in the Vietnam War as part of the 1st Battalion Group, Royal Australian Regiment (see Non-U.S. recipients of U.S. gallantry awards).

In 1995 the unit received the Meritorious Unit Commendation (MUC) in recognition of its service with the United States 173rd Airborne Brigade during the Vietnam War.

In 2011 the Governor General of New Zealand, on behalf of HM Queen Elizabeth II, gave permission for 16 Field Regt RNZA to wear the South Korean Presidential Unit Citation, by all Officers and NCO's attached to the Regiment, however after their appoints finish with the Regiment the Citation is handed back to the Regiment.

In 2019 the Australian government awarded veterans of 161 Battery who had fought at the Battles of Coral and Balmoral the Australian Unit Citation for Gallantry for "extraordinary gallantry".

Uniform
The RNZA were distinguished by a blue and red puggaree around the traditional "Lemon Squeezer" hat of the New Zealand Army, until this headdress fell into abeyance in the late 1950s. It has subsequently been reintroduced for ceremonial use but the RNZA now wear the same red puggaree as most other corps and regiments. Artillery officers wore a dark blue jacket and trousers with red lapels and trouser stripes for mess dress but this has now been phased out in favour of a universal scarlet mess jacket worn by all branches of the Army.

Band

The Band of the Royal Regiment of New Zealand Artillery (abbreviated to Royal NZ Artillery Band) is an Auckland-based supporting musical unit for the Royal New Zealand Artillery. It is specifically based out of Panmure, a south-eastern suburb of Auckland and is affiliated with the 16th Field Regiment, RNZA. It is a volunteer band since being disestablished as an NZDF unit in 2012. However it remains supported by the Regiment through a formal agreement. As of 2021, the band is the oldest surviving military band in the country, being founded in 1864. The band performs at a range of events that include commemorations, ceremonies, concerts, Military Tattoos, Military Parades and medal presentation ceremonies.

Affiliations
 – Royal Artillery
 – Royal Canadian Artillery
 – Royal Australian Artillery

Gallery

Order of precedence

See also
Coastal fortifications of New Zealand

Notes

References

Further reading

External links

Kiwi Gunners in War and Peace
New Zealand Artillery: The Official Website of the RNZA Association
Vietnam War: Battle of Coral-Balmoral 1968 
161 Battery and 173rd Airborne in Vietnam

Administrative corps of New Zealand
Artillery administrative corps
Military units and formations established in 1902
Organisations based in New Zealand with royal patronage
Artillery units and formations of New Zealand
Military units and formations of New Zealand in the Korean War